The Jaú River is a river in the São Paulo state of southeastern Brazil.

See also
List of rivers of São Paulo

References
Brazilian Ministry of Transport

Rivers of São Paulo (state)
Tributaries of the Tietê